Zhang Caihua (born 10 December 1964) is a Chinese sprinter. She competed in the women's 100 metres at the 1988 Summer Olympics.

References

External links
 

1964 births
Living people
Athletes (track and field) at the 1988 Summer Olympics
Chinese female sprinters
Olympic athletes of China
Place of birth missing (living people)
Asian Games medalists in athletics (track and field)
Asian Games gold medalists for China
Athletes (track and field) at the 1990 Asian Games
Medalists at the 1990 Asian Games
Olympic female sprinters
20th-century Chinese women